Elliott White Springs (July 31, 1896 – October 15, 1959), was a South Carolina businessman and an American flying ace of World War I, credited with shooting down 16 enemy aircraft.

Early life
Springs was born to Col. Leroy Springs and Grace Allison White Springs. His father was a noted South Carolina textiles manufacturer. Springs attended Culver Military Academy, and then Princeton University.

World War I service

Springs enlisted in the United States Army in the autumn of 1917. He was sent to England to train with the [Royal Flying Corps], and was selected by the Canadian flying ace Billy Bishop to fly the S.E.5 with 85 Squadron over France.
After claiming three destroyed and one 'out of control' with 85 Squadron, Springs was shot down on 27 June 1918 by Lt. Josef Raesch of Jasta 43. After recovering from wounds received, he was reassigned to the U.S. Air Service's 148th Aero Squadron, flying the Sopwith Camel

On 3 August 1918, while escorting Airco DH.9 bombers, Springs shot down three Fokker D.VII scouts in flames. On 22 August 1918 he attacked five Fokker DVIIs, shooting down one into a wood near Velu. He sent another enemy aircraft 'out of control'. On 22 August 1918 he engaged three Fokker DVIIs, and Springs claimed two shot down, with one 'out of control'.

By 24 September 1918 Springs had claimed 10 victories destroyed, 2 shared destroyed and 4 driven down 'out of control'. He had shared three wins with such squadron mates as Lieutenants Henry Clay and Orville Ralston.  Also about this time Springs rose to command the 148th as it and the 17th Aero Squadron joined the 4th Pursuit Group.

Return to civilian life
Upon his return to the United States, Springs wrote numerous books, short stories, and articles. Many of these were about his experiences in combat aviation. The most notable of these was Warbirds: The Diary of an Unknown Aviator, which was found later to be the diary of John McGavock Grider a friend and comrade of his who did not survive the war. He was also known for carousing, habits he picked up overseas in the War. He toured speakeasies, drank heavily, chased women, and hosted all-night parties. He regularly visited friends "with a five-gallon jug and a strange woman." 

He also did some barnstorming after his return.  On November 11, 1953, he appeared on an episode of I've Got a Secret.

Management of Springs Cotton Mills
Springs' profligate life changed in 1931 when his father died and he took over running the family textile firm. 

Though the firm was heavily mortgaged, Springs saved the company while, among other things, slashing his own salary. Springs even put a loom in his basement to try out new ideas. Because of his actions, the family firm made it through the Great Depression which saw many of his competitors close.

Return to service
In 1941, Springs returned to his nation's service in the U.S. Army Air Corps.

Later years and death
Springs continued to run Springs Cotton Mills until shortly before his death. He died of pancreatic cancer.

His home, known as the William Elliott White House, was added to the National Register of Historic Places in 1987.

See also

 List of World War I flying aces from the United States

References

Bibliography
 Davis, Burke. War Bird: The Life and Times of Elliott White Springs. Chapel Hill: University of North Carolina Press, 1987.
 Letters from a War Bird: The World War I Correspondence of Elliott White Springs. Edited by David K. Vaughan. Columbia, SC: University of South Carolina Press, 2012.

External links

South Carolina Business Hall of Fame profile
Foundation for New Media - Elliott White Springs
White Homestead and Store - Fort Mill, S.C.

1896 births
1959 deaths
People from Lancaster, South Carolina
Princeton University alumni
United States Army personnel of World War I
United States Army personnel of World War II
United States Army officers
American World War I flying aces
Recipients of the Distinguished Flying Cross (United Kingdom)
Recipients of the Distinguished Service Cross (United States)
Textile companies of the United States
Deaths from pancreatic cancer
People from Fort Mill, South Carolina
Culver Academies alumni
United States Army Air Service pilots of World War I